Major-General Richard Alchorne Worge (1707 – 4 May 1774) was an English General in the British Army, Governor of Senegal, and a Member of Parliament for Stockbridge.

He was born the second son of Thomas Worge of Eastbourne, Sussex and joined the Army around 1724.

He was promoted lieutenant in the 11th Foot in 1732, captain in the 25th Foot in 1738, major in 1745 and lieutenant-colonel of the 9th Foot in 1754. During that time he was severely wounded at the Battle of Fontenoy, took part in the Battle of Culloden, and served in Flanders.

In 1759, during the Seven Years' War, he was made lieutenant-colonel commanding the newly formed 86th Foot and sailed with them to the newly captured Island of Gorée, off the coast of Senegal. From Gorée he administered the former French territory of Senegal as Governor until his return to England after the Treaty of Paris in 1763. He was promoted a colonel of the army in 1762 and raised to major-general in 1770.

He was returned to Parliament in 1768 as member for Stockbridge, sitting until taking the Chiltern Hundreds in 1772.

Worge died in 1774 and was buried at St Mary the Virgin Church, Old Town, Eastbourne, East Sussex.

He had married Jane Bowman of Ormskirk, Lancashire and had one daughter.

References

External links
 Biography of General Worge

1707 births
1774 deaths
Burials in East Sussex
British Army generals
British colonial governors and administrators in Africa
Members of the Parliament of Great Britain for English constituencies
British MPs 1768–1774
Devonshire Regiment officers
King's Own Scottish Borderers officers
Royal Norfolk Regiment officers
British Army personnel of the Jacobite rising of 1745
British Army personnel of the War of the Austrian Succession
British Army personnel of the Seven Years' War